This is a list of notable XML schemas in use on the Internet sorted by purpose. XML schemas can be used to create XML documents for a wide range of purposes such as syndication, general exchange, and storage of data in a standard format.

Bookmarks 
 XBEL - XML Bookmark Exchange Language

Brewing 
BeerXML - a free XML based data description standard for the exchange of brewing data

Business 
Auto-lead Data Format - for communicating consumer purchase requests to automotive dealerships.
ACORD data standards - Insurance Industry XML schemas specifications by Association for Cooperative Operations Research and Development
 Europass XML - XML vocabulary describing the information contained in a Curriculum Vitae (CV), Language Passport (LP) and European Skills Passport (ESP)
OSCRE - Open Standards Consortium for Real Estate format for data exchange within the real estate industry
UBL - Defining a common XML library of business documents (purchase orders, invoices, etc.) by Oasis
XBRL Extensible Business Reporting Language for International Financial Reporting Standards (IFRS) and United States generally accepted accounting principles (GAAP) business accounting.

Elections 
 EML - Election Markup Language, is an OASIS standard to support end-to-end management of election processes. It defines over thirty schemas, for example EML 510 for vote count reporting and EML 310 for voter registration.

Engineering 
gbXML - an open schema developed to facilitate transfer of building data stored in Building Information Models (BIMs) to engineering analysis tools. 
IFC-XML - Building Information Models for architecture, engineering, construction, and operations.
XMI - an Object Management Group (OMG) standard for exchanging metadata information, commonly used for exchange of UML information
XTCE - XML Telemetric and Command Exchange is an XML based data exchange format for spacecraft telemetry and command meta-data

Financial 
 FIXatdl - FIX algorithmic trading definition language. Schema provides a HCI between a human trader, the order entry screen(s), unlimited different algorithmic trading types (called strategies) from a variety of sources, and formats a new order message on the FIX wire.
 FIXML - Financial Information eXchange (FIX) protocol is an electronic communications protocol initiated in 1992 for international real-time exchange of information related to the securities transactions and markets.
 FpML - Financial products Markup Language is the industry-standard protocol for complex financial products. It is based on XML (eXtensible Markup Language), the standard meta-language for describing data shared between applications.

Geographic information systems and geotagging 
 KML - Keyhole Markup Language is used for annotation on geographical browsers including Google Earth and NASA's World Wind. These annotations are used to place events such as earthquake warnings, historical events, etc.
 SensorML - used for describing sensors and measurement processes

Graphical user interfaces 
 FIXatdl - algorithmic trading GUIs (language independent)
 FXML - Extensible Application Markup Language for Java
 GLADE - GNOME's User Interface Language (GTK+)
KParts - KDE's User Interface Language (Qt)
UXP - Unified XUL Platform, a 2017 fork of XUL.
XAML - Microsoft's Extensible Application Markup Language
XForms - XForms
XUL  - XML User Interface Language (Native)

Humanities texts 
EpiDoc - Epigraphic Documents
TEI - Text Encoding Initiative

Intellectual property 
 DS-XML - Industrial Design Information Exchange Standard
 IPMM Invention Disclosure Standard
 TM-XML - Trade Mark Information Exchange Standard

Libraries 
 EAD - for encoding archival finding aids, maintained by the Technical Subcommittee for Encoded Archival Description of the Society of American Archivists, in partnership with the Library of Congress
 MARCXML - a direct mapping of the MARC standard to XML syntax
 METS - a schema for aggregating in a single XML file descriptive, administrative, and structural metadata about a digital object
 MODS - a schema for a bibliographic element set and maintained by the  Network Development and MARC Standards Office of the Library of Congress

Math and science 
 MathML - Mathematical Markup Language
 ANSI N42.42 or "N42" - NIST data format standard for radiation detectors used for Homeland Security

Metadata 
DDML - reformulations XML DTD
ONIX for Books - ONline Information eXchange, developed and maintained by EDItEUR jointly with Book Industry Communication (UK) and the Book Industry Study Group (US), and with user groups in Australia, Canada, France, Germany, Italy, the Netherlands, Norway, Spain and the Republic of Korea.
PRISM -  Publishing Requirements for Industry Standard Metadata
RDF - Resource Description Framework

Music playlists 
 XSPF  - XML Shareable Playlist Format

Musical notation 
 MusicXML - XML western musical notation format

News syndication 
 Atom  - Atom
 RSS - Really Simple Syndication

Paper and forest products 

EPPML - an XML conceptual model for the interactions between parties of a postal communication system.
papiNet - XML format for exchange of business documents and product information in the paper and forest products industries.

Publishing 
DITA - Darwin Information Typing Architecture, document authoring system
DocBook - for technical documentation
JATS (formerly known as the NLM DTD) - Journal Article Tag Suite, a journal publishing structure originally developed by the United States National Library of Medicine
PRISM - Publishing Requirements for Industry Standard Metadata

Statistics 
DDI - "Data Documentation Initiative" is a format for information describing statistical and social science data (and the lifecycle).
SDMX - SDMX-ML is a format for exchange and sharing of Statistical Data and Metadata.

Vector images 
 SVG - Scalable Vector Graphics

See also 
 List of XML markup languages
 XML Schema Language Comparison
 XML transformation language
 XML pipeline
 Data Format Description Language
 XML log

Notes

External links 
 Schema Documentation Library

Data modeling languages
XML Schemas
Financial industry XML-based standards